Mohammad Aeltemesh, also known as Aeltemesh Rein, was an Indian lawyer who practised before the Supreme Court of India from 1978 until the early 2000s.

"A lawyer once enrolled under the Advocates Act, may practice throughout India." This contention was raised by him before the Honourable Supreme Court of India upon which the Government was asked to notify section 30 of the Advocates Act. It took the government more than a decade to notify Section 30 of the Advocates Act.

Career
In 1982 he established his Law firm Aeltemesh Rein & Co. Law Consultants.

References

External links
Website of Aeltemesh Rein & Co. Law Consultants
Website of Bhilai
Bhilai Steel Plant
View of Bhilai Steel Plant

20th-century Indian lawyers
People from Hazaribagh district
People from Bihar
People from New Delhi
Bhilai
1948 births
2013 deaths
De Nobili Schools alumni
Ranchi University alumni